PCDI may refer to:
 Ashworth College, formerly Professional Career Development Institute
 Communist Party of Italy (Partito Comunista d’Italia), a communist political party in Italy which existed 1921–26
 Communist Party of Italy (2014) (Partito Comunista d'Italia), a short-lived communist party in Italy 2014–16
 People's Commissariat of Defence Industry  of the USSR, the central offices in the Soviet Union that oversaw production of the defense industry

See also
 Democratic Party of Côte d'Ivoire – African Democratic Rally, (PDCI-RDA